Larry David White (born September 25, 1958) is a former professional baseball pitcher. He pitched in 11 games for the Los Angeles Dodgers of Major League Baseball (MLB). in the 1983 and 1984 seasons.

External links

1958 births
Living people
African-American baseball players
Albuquerque Dukes players
American expatriate baseball players in Mexico
Baseball players from California
Batavia Trojans players
Chattanooga Lookouts players
Ganaderos de Tabasco players
LAPC Brahma Bulls baseball players
Los Angeles Dodgers players
Major League Baseball pitchers
Mexican League baseball pitchers
People from San Fernando, California
San Francisco State Gators baseball players
Waterloo Indians players
21st-century African-American people
20th-century African-American sportspeople
San Fernando High School alumni